Latham Avery Burrows (August 30, 1792 Groton, New London County, Connecticut – September 25, 1855 Buffalo, Erie County, New York) was an American politician from New York.

Life

He was the son of Rev. Roswell Burrows (1768–1837) and Jerusha (Avery) Burrows (1771–1838). He removed to Owego, New York. In 1816, he married Sarah Lester.

He was a presidential elector in 1820, voting for James Monroe and Daniel D. Tompkins. Burrows was Clerk of Broome County, New York from 1821 to 1822.

He was a member of the New York State Senate (6th D.) from 1824 to 1827, sitting in the 47th, 48th, 49th and 50th New York State Legislatures.

In 1848, he was Collector of Tolls for the Erie Canal at Buffalo.

New York State Comptroller Lorenzo Burrows (1805–1885) was his brother.

Sources
History of the Town of Stonington, County of New London, Connecticut by Richard Anson Wheeler (1900; pg. 283)
The New York Civil List compiled by Franklin Benjamin Hough (pages 125ff, 139, 326 and 386; Weed, Parsons and Co., 1858)
Burrows genealogy at RootsWeb
Marriage notice, transcribed from the Connecticut Courant, at RootsWeb
The Buffalo Directory (1848; pg. 37)

1792 births
1855 deaths
People from Groton, Connecticut
Politicians from Binghamton, New York
Politicians from Buffalo, New York
New York (state) state senators
New York (state) Democratic-Republicans
1820 United States presidential electors
19th-century American politicians
County clerks in New York (state)